Nur Mohammad may refer to:
 Nur Mohammad Kandi, Iran
 Nur Mohammad Sheikh (1936–1971)
 Nur Mohammad, Hirmand, Iran
 Nur Mohammad-e Yusef Rudini, Iran
 Nur Mohammad (police officer), Bangladeshi former Inspector General of Bangladesh Police